Huang Yu-ting is a Taiwanese speed skater who has competed in inline speed skating, short track speed skating, and long track speed skating. She was the flagbearer for the 'Chinese Taipei' team at the Beijing 2022 Winter Olympic Games' opening ceremony.

As an inline speed skater, Huang won three gold medals at the 2009 World Games in Kaohsiung, Republic of China (Taiwan) representing the Chinese Taipei team: 300 m time trial, 500 m sprint, and 1000 m sprint. At the 2010 Asian Games, she competed in the women's 300 metres time trial and 500 metres sprint events. She won two medals at the 2013 World Games in Cali, Colombia: a gold in the 1000 m sprint and a bronze in the 500 m sprint.

In short track speed skating at the 2007 Asian Winter Games, Huang competed in the women's 500 metres, 1000 metres, 1500 metres, and 3000 metres relay events.

Huang competed as a long track speed skater at the 2018 Winter Olympics, in the women's 500 metres, 1000 metres, and 1500 metres events.

Controversy
In early 2022, Huang garnered much controversy after a video that she posted on 23 January, went viral of her wearing an outfit labeled "China" during practice, and she was later criticised heavily by Taiwanese netizens, especially those with pan-green political views, which had flooded her Facebook and Instagram account with hate comments. In response, Huang claimed on Instagram that the outfit was a gift from an athlete on the Chinese team, whom she befriended in Germany. She also posted a Taylor Swift music video, "Shake It Off," which is famed for its lyrics, "Haters gonna hate, hate, hate, hate," and she wrote alongside the video, "My dear haters, this song is for you."

Huang later removed the video post due to the social media backlash afterwards. According to a translation by the South China Morning Post, Huang separately made a post on Facebook where she wrote, "Thank you to everyone who cheered me up...I have removed the video due to too many unnecessary private messages!..."Sport is sport and in the world of sports, we do not differentiate between nationalities. After the Games, we all are good friends."

Ho Chih-wei, a Legislative Yuan member of the ruling Democratic Progressive Party (DPP) criticised Huang Yu-ting, calling her "brainless" and demanding that she "shut up", as well as supporting a law that would punish athletes such as Huang with bans from sport events. Taiwan Premier Su Tseng-chang from the ruling DPP called for an investigation and punishment for Huang. On 3 March 2022, the Sports Administration announced that it would suspend Huang's subsidies for training and competition for a two-year period.

References

External links

 

1988 births
Living people
Taiwanese female speed skaters
Taiwanese female short track speed skaters
Inline speed skaters
Olympic speed skaters of Taiwan
Speed skaters at the 2018 Winter Olympics
Speed skaters at the 2022 Winter Olympics
Asian Games medalists in roller sports
Asian Games gold medalists for Chinese Taipei
Roller skaters at the 2010 Asian Games
Medalists at the 2010 Asian Games
Short track speed skaters at the 2007 Asian Winter Games
World Games gold medalists
World Games bronze medalists
Competitors at the 2009 World Games
Competitors at the 2013 World Games
Victims of cyberbullying